Team Surprise was a senior synchronized skating team from Sweden. Established in 1985, they were the world's most successful team with six world championships and 12 medals in total, placing off podium only in 2010, 2011, and 2013-17.

On 3 October 2018 the team announced their disbandment.

Programs

Competitive highlights

2009-10 to 2017-18 seasons

1999-00 to 2008-09 seasons

References

External links
Official website of Team Surprise

Senior synchronized skating teams
Sports teams in Sweden
World Synchronized Skating Championships medalists